Wu Ta-hsin or Wu Daxin (1933–2005) was a Chinese t'ai chi ch'uan teacher who lived most of his life in Hong Kong. He was the great-grandson Wu-style t'ai chi ch'uan founder Wu Ch'uan-yu and the grandson of the well-known teacher Wu Chien-ch'uan. He directed the Wu family's lineage for four years from the Wu family headquarters in Hong Kong after the death of his cousin Wu Yen-hsia.

Biography
Born into a Manchu military family known for their contributions towards preserving knowledge of the traditional Chinese martial arts, Wu Ta-hsin endured strict training from his grandfather Wu Chien-ch'uan, uncle Wu Kung-i and father Wu Kung-tsao. He eventually became known as a teacher and for his expertise with the t'ai chi sabre and sword as well as for his qigong and pushing hands skills.
 
When Wu Kung-i moved with his family to Hong Kong in the 1940s, Wu Ta-hsin assisted him in the promotion and teaching of t'ai chi ch'uan. During the 1950s, at the direction of Wu Kung-i, Wu Ta-hsin and his cousins Wu Ta-kuei and Wu Ta-ch'i often travelled to Malaysia and Singapore to start and manage several Wu style academies. Later in his life, he also travelled extensively to North America, teaching t'ai chi ch'uan in Toronto, Detroit and Vancouver.

Generational senior instructors of the Wu family
1st Generation
Wu Ch'uan-yü (Wu Quanyou, 吳全佑, 1834–1902), who learned from Yang Luchan and Yang Pan-hou, was senior instructor of the family from 1870 to 1902.

2nd generation
His oldest son, Wu Chien-ch'üan (Wu Jianquan, 吳鑑泉, 1870–1942), was senior from 1902 to 1942.

3rd Generation
His oldest son, Wu Kung-i (Wu Gongyi, 吳公儀, 1900–1970) was senior from 1942 to 1970.
Wu Kung-i's younger brother, Wu Kung-tsao (Wu Gongzao, 吳公藻, 1903–1983), was senior from 1970 to 1983.
Wu Kung-i's younger sister, Wu Ying-hua (Wu Yinghua, 吳英華, 1907–1997), was senior from 1983 to 1997.

4th Generation
Wu Kung-i's daughter, Wu Yen-hsia (Wu Yanxia, 吳雁霞, 1930–2001) was senior from 1997 to 2001.
Wu Kung-tsao's son, Wu Ta-hsin (Wu Daxin, 吳大新, 1933–2005), was senior from 2001 to 2005.

5th Generation
The current senior instructor of the Wu family is Wu Ta-k'uei's son Wu Kuang-yu (Wu Guangyu, Eddie Wu, 吳光宇, born 1946).

T'ai chi ch'uan lineage tree with Wu-style focus

References

External links
 
 International Wu Style Tai Chi Chuan Federation website

1923 births
2005 deaths
Chinese tai chi practitioners
Manchu martial artists
Chinese emigrants to British Hong Kong